The Cascouia River is a tributary of Kenogami Lake, flowing in the municipality of Larouche in the Le Fjord-du-Saguenay Regional County Municipality and in the city of Saguenay, in the administrative region of Saguenay–Lac-Saint-Jean, in the province of Quebec, in Canada.

The Cascouia river valley is served by the route 169 and the “route des Bâtisseurs” which bypasses the northern part of the lake. This valley is also served by a few secondary forest roads, especially for forestry and recreational tourism activities.

Recreational and tourist activities are the main economic activity around Cascouia Bay, especially vacationing around Lac du Camp; hydroelectric activities, second; forestry, third.

The surface of the Cascouia River is usually frozen from the beginning of December to the end of March, however the safe circulation on the ice is generally made from mid-December to mid-March.

Geography 
Following successive increases in the water level of Kenogami Lake in the early 20th century, Cascouia Bay expanded at the expense of the former Cascouia River, becoming a lake pass. The Cascouia River is located in the former municipality of lac-Kénogami.

The main watersheds neighboring the Cascouia River are:
 north side: Chamois lake, Potvin lake, Bruyère River, Dorval River, Dupéré brook, Saguenay River;
 east side: Kenogami Lake, rivière aux Sables, Chicoutimi River;
 south side: Kenogami Lake, Pikauba River, ruisseau L'Abbé;
 west side: Vert Lake, Rivière des Aulnaies, Pont Flottant stream, La Belle Rivière.

The Cascouia river originates from a small unidentified lake in the shape of a V. This source is located at:
  south-west of the village center of Larouche where the Canadian National railway passes;
  north-west of Cascouia Bay from Kenogami Lake;
  south of the Saguenay River;
  south-east of downtown Alma;
  north-west of the confluence of the Pikauba River and Kenogami Lake;
  east of the barrage de Portage-des-Roches;
  south-west of the confluence of the Chicoutimi River and the Saguenay River.

  towards the south-east crossing the current Cascouia bay, up to the Cascouia pass;
  south-east across the Cascouia pass, to the natural mouth of the river.

The old course of the Cascouia River emptied into Epiphanes Bay on the north shore of Kenogami Lake; following the erection of dams on Kenogami River, the old course is largely under the waters of this dam lake. This former confluence was located at:
  east of the rue des Bâtisseurs bridge (spanning the Cascouia river);
  south of autoroute 70;
  southwest of Lac Barrage Pibrac-Ouest, located at the head of the rivière aux Sables;
  south-west of Jonquière town center;
  west of the barrage de Portage-des-Roches;
  south-west of the confluence of the Chicoutimi River and the Saguenay River.

Toponymy 
Cascouia Bay is frequently called “Lac Cascouia”, due to its isolation from the central part of Kenogami Lake.

One of the first known mentions of the Innu word "Cascaouia" is attributed to the surveyor Joseph-Laurent Normandin, in 1732, who wrote in his Journal: "... There is a large bay, which is bordered by jongs and grasses, that the Indians call Les Gachek8illaces de Quinongamingue ”. Normandin also uses the form "Baye des Gachek8illasses". By modifying its primitive form in order to facilitate its use, the first explorers perpetuated this Amerindian term meaning "grasslands" or "rushes". For some, it is actually cattails. Several orthographic variants exist for this appellation, in particular: Kascouia, Kaskauia, Kaskovia, Kaskouia and Kashkouia. Other Amerindian spelling noted: Kashkouillasses.

The toponym “rivière Cascouia” was formalized on December 5, 1968, at the Place Names Bank of the Commission de toponymie du Québec.

See also 
 List of rivers of Quebec

References 

Le Fjord-du-Saguenay Regional County Municipality
Rivers of Saguenay–Lac-Saint-Jean
Geography of Saguenay, Quebec